Shina is an Indo-Aryan language spoken by the Shina people. In Pakistan, Shina is the major language in Gilgit-Baltistan spoken by an estimated 1,146,000 people living mainly in Gilgit-Baltistan and Kohistan. A small community of Shina speakers is also found in India, in the Guraiz valley of Jammu and Kashmir and in Dras valley of Ladakh. Outliers of Shina language such as Brokskat are found in Ladakh, Kundal Shahi in Azad Kashmir, Palula and Sawi in Chitral, Ushojo in the Swat Valley and Kalkoti in Dir.

Until recently, there was no writing system for the language. A number of schemes have been proposed, and there is no single writing system used by speakers of Shina language. Shina is mostly a spoken language and not a written language. Most Shina speakers do not write their language.

Distribution

In Pakistan 
There are an estimated 1,146,000 speakers of both Shina and Kohistani Shina in Pakistan according to Ethnologue (2018), a majority of them in the province of Khyber-Pakhtunkwa and Gilgit-Baltistan. A small community of Shina speakers is also settled in Neelam valley of Azad Jammu and Kashmir.

In India 
A small community of Shina speakers is also settled in India in the far north of Kargil district bordering Gilgit-Baltistan. Their population is estimated to be around 32,200 according to 2011 census.

Writing

Shina is one of the few Dardic languages with a written tradition. However, it was an unwritten language until a few decades ago and there still is not a standard orthography. Since the first attempts at accurately representing Shina's phonology in the 1960s there have been several proposed orthographies for the different varieties of the language, with debates centering on whether vowel length and tone should be represented. For the Drasi variety spoken in the Indian union territories of Ladakh and Jammu and Kashmir, there have been two proposed schemes, one with the Perso-Arabic script and the other with the Devanagari script.

One proposed alphabet for Shina is the following:

Phonology
The following is a description of the phonology of the Drasi ,Sheena variety spoken in India and the Kohistani variety in Pakistan.

Vowels

The Shina principal vowel sounds:

All vowels but /ɔ/ can be either long or nasalized, though no minimal pairs with the contrast are found. /æ/ is heard from loanwords.

Diphthongs
In Shina there are the following diphthongs: 
 falling: ae̯, ao̯, eə̯, ɛi̯, ɛːi̯, ue̯, ui̯, oi̯, oə̯; 
 falling nasalized: ãi̯, ẽi̯, ũi̯, ĩũ̯, ʌĩ̯;
 raising: u̯i, u̯e, a̯a, u̯u.

Consonants
In India, the dialects of the Shina language have preserved both initial and final OIA consonant clusters, while the Shina dialects spoken in Pakistan have not.

Tone

Shina words are often distinguished by three contrasting tones: level, rising, and falling tones. Here is an example that shows the three tones:

"The" has a level tone and means the imperative "Do!"

When the stress falls on the first mora of a long vowel, the tone is falling. Thée means "Will you do?"

When the stress falls on the second mora of a long vowel, the tone is rising. Theé means "after having done".

See also
Brokskat language
Kundal Shahi language
Ushoji language
Kalkoti language
Palula language
Savi language

References

Bibliography

Further reading 
 A history of the development of writing in Shina
 Contains a Shina grammar, German-Shina and Shina-German dictionaries, and over 700 Shina proverbs and short texts. 

 Contains 15000 words plus material on the phonetics of Shina.

External links

 Sasken Shina, contains materials in and about the language
 1992 Sociolinguistic Survey of Shina
 Shina Language Textbook for Class5
 Shina Language Textbook for Class6

Dardic languages
Languages of Gilgit-Baltistan
Languages of Khyber Pakhtunkhwa
Languages of Jammu and Kashmir
Tonal languages in non-tonal families